California's 1st State Senate District is one of 40 California State Senate districts. Republican Brian Dahle represents the district, having won the seat in a June 2019 special election after Republican Ted Gaines of El Dorado Hills resigned to become a member of the California Board of Equalization in January 2019.

District profile 
The district stretches along the eastern edge of the state from the Oregon border to the Lake Tahoe area. It wraps around the Sacramento Valley along the northern Sierra Nevada, extending westward into the eastern Sacramento suburbs. While the district is primarily rural, a substantial minority of the population is concentrated in the suburban southwestern portion.

All of Alpine County
 Markleeville

All of El Dorado County
 Placerville
 South Lake Tahoe

All of Lassen County
 Susanville

All of Modoc County
 Alturas

All of Nevada County
 Grass Valley
 Nevada City
 Truckee

Placer County – 62.9%
 Auburn
 Colfax
 Lincoln
 Loomis
 Rocklin
All of Plumas County
 Portola

Sacramento County – 10.2%
 Fair Oaks
 Folsom
 Gold River
 Orangevale

All of Shasta County
 Anderson
 Redding
 Shasta Lake

All of Sierra County
 Loyalton

All of Siskiyou County
 Dorris
 Dunsmuir
 Etna
 Fort Jones
 Montague
 Mount Shasta
 Tulelake
 Weed
 Yreka

Election results from statewide races

List of senators 
Due to redistricting, the 1st district has been moved around different parts of the state. The current iteration resulted from the 2011 redistricting by the California Citizens Redistricting Commission.

Election results 1992 - present

2020

2019 (special)

2016

2012

2011 (special)

2008

2004

2000

1996

1992

See also 
 California State Senate
 California State Senate districts
 Districts in California

References

External links 
 District map from the California Citizens Redistricting Commission

01
Government of Alpine County, California
Government of El Dorado County, California
Government of Lassen County, California
Government of Modoc County, California
Government of Mono County, California
Government of Nevada County, California
Government of Placer County, California
Government of Plumas County, California
Government of Sacramento County, California
Government of Shasta County, California
Government of Sierra County, California
Government of Siskiyou County, California
Sierra Nevada (United States)
Shasta Cascade
Alturas, California
Downieville, California
Folsom, California
Grass Valley, California
Mount Shasta
Mount Shasta, California (city)
Nevada City, California
Placerville, California
Quincy, California
Redding, California
South Lake Tahoe, California
Truckee, California
Yreka, California
Constituencies established in 1850
1850 establishments in California